Obscurella is a genus of land snails with an operculum, terrestrial gastropod mollusks in the family Cochlostomatidae.

Species
 Obscurella aprica (Mousson, 1847)
 Obscurella asturica (Raven, 1990)
 Obscurella bicostulata Gofas, 1989
 † Obscurella buxovillana (Wenz, 1923) 
 † Obscurella cieuracensis (Noulet, 1868) 
 Obscurella conica (Vallot, 1801)
 † Obscurella crassicosta (F. Sandberger, 1870) 
 Obscurella crassilabrum (Dupuy, 1849)
 Obscurella filholi (Filhol, 1877) 
 Obscurella gigas Gofas & Backeljau, 1994
 † Obscurella heterostoma (F. E. Edwards, 1852) 
 Obscurella hidalgoi (Crosse, 1864)
 † Obscurella lamellosa (F. Sandberger, 1871) 
 † Obscurella lugdunensis (Delafond & Depéret, 1893) 
 Obscurella marocana (Pallary, 1928)
 Obscurella martorelli (Servain, 1880)
 † Obscurella mirifica (Cossmann, 1899) 
 Obscurella nouleti (Dupuy, 1851)
 Obscurella obscura (Draparnaud, 1805)
 Obscurella oscitans Gofas, 1989
 Obscurella partioti (Saint-Simon, 1848)
 † Obscurella prisca (Wenz, 1930) 
 † Obscurella ressonii (de Raincourt, 1876) 
 † Obscurella sandbergeri (Noulet, 1868) 
Synonyms
 † Obscurella lamellosea [sic]: synonym of † Obscurella lamellosa (F. Sandberger, 1871)  (incorrect subsequent spelling)
 † Obscurella ressoni [sic]: synonym of † Obscurella ressonii (de Raincourt, 1876) (incorrect subsequent spelling)

References

  Bank, R. A. (2017). Classification of the Recent terrestrial Gastropoda of the World. Last update: July 16th, 2017

External linkjs
 
 Clessin, S. (1887-1890). Die Mollusken-Fauna Mitteleuropa's. II. Teil. Die Molluskenfauna Oesterreich-Ungarns und der Schweiz, 858 pp. [part 1: 1-160 (1887); part 2: 161-320 (1887); part 3: 321-480 (1888); part 4: 481-624 (1889); part 5: 625-858 (1890). Nürnberg (Bauer & Raspe)]
 Wagner, A. J. (1897). Monographie der Gattung Pomatias Studer. Denkschriften der Kaiserlichen Akademie der Wissenschaften, mathematisch-naturwissenschaftliche Classe. 64: 565-632, pls 1-10. Wien
 Westerlund, C. A. (1883). Malakologische Miscellen. Jahrbücher der Deutschen Malakozoologischen Gesellschaft. 10 (1): 51-72, Frankfurt am Main

Gastropod genera
Cyclophoroidea